Jean Decety is an American-French neuroscientist specializing in developmental neuroscience, affective neuroscience, and social neuroscience. His research focuses on the psychological and neurobiological mechanisms underpinning social cognition, particularly social decision-making, empathy, moral reasoning, altruism, pro-social behavior, and more generally interpersonal relationships. He is Irving B. Harris Distinguished Service Professor at the University of Chicago.

Background
Jean Decety obtained three advanced master's degrees in 1985 (neuroscience), in 1986 (cognitive psychology), and in 1987 (biomedical engineering science) and was awarded a Ph.D. in 1989 (neurobiology - medicine) from the Université Claude Bernard. After receiving his doctorate, he worked as a post-doctoral fellow at the hospital in Lund (Sweden) in the Department of Neurophysiology, then in the Karolinska Hospital, Stockholm (Sweden) in the Departments of Neurophysiology and Neuroradiology. He then joined the National Institute for Medical Research (INSERM) in Lyon (France) until 2001.

Decety is currently professor at the University of Chicago and the College, with appointments in the Department of Psychology, and in the Department of Psychiatry and Behavioral Neuroscience. He is the Director of the Social Cognitive Neuroscience Laboratory, and the Child NeuroSuite. Decety is a member of the Committee on Computational Neuroscience and the Center for Integrative Neuroscience and Neuroengineering. In 2022, Decety was elected as a member of the Academia Europaea, a pan-European Academy of Humanities, Letters, Law, and Sciences, in the Physiology and Neuroscience section.

Editorial activities
Decety served as the founder and editor-in-chief of the journal Social Neuroscience between 2006 and 2012, and he is on the editorial boards of Development and Psychopathology, The European Journal of Neuroscience, The Scientific World Journal, Frontiers in Emotion Science, and Neuropsychologia.  With his colleague John Cacioppo, Decety played an instrumental role in the creation of the Society for Social Neuroscience in 2010.

Mental simulation of actions
Mental simulation, also known as motor imagery, mental practice, or mental rehearsal, refers to the human cognitive ability to imagine doing a specific action or behavior and simulating the probable outcome before acting. It has been part of elite sports training for a long time. Olympians use imagery as mental training Research pioneered by Decety using psychophysics, functional neuroimaging, H-reflex excitability, as well as measures of the autonomic nervous system, demonstrated that imagining an action activates similar neural representations that would be engaged by carrying out the same action.  For instance, an increase in heart rate and respiratory rate is proportional to the level of mental effort in athletes who imagine running on a treadmill at different speeds. Imagining doing an action is associated with activation of the supplementary motor area, parietal cortex, somatosensory cortex, and cerebellum, brain regions involved in motor control. Together, these findings have been interpreted as a demonstration of functional equivalence between the imagination and the production of action, to the extent that they share the same motor representations underpinned by the same neurophysiological substrate. This theoretical framework was then extended to empathy and some aspects of social cognition.

Empathy, moral reasoning and prosocial behavior
Decety studies the neurobiological and psychological mechanisms that guide social decision-making, moral reasoning, empathy and sensitivity for justice, as well as how these abilities develop in children, and are shaped by life experiences and group dynamics. Decety conducts research on various aspects of empathy, including its evolutionary origins, its development in young children, as well as how empathy is modulated by the social environment and interpersonal relationships.

Decety investigates the development of moral behavior, generosity and distributive justice in children across South East Asia, Europe, the Middle East, North and South America, and South Africa. He argues that empathy is not necessarily a direct avenue to moral behavior, and that it can lead to immoral behavior. The influence that empathy and justice exert on one another is complex, and empathy can induce partiality and threaten justice principles.

Based on empirical research combining functional neuroimaging (fMRI and EEG), developmental psychology, and individual differences in personality traits, Decety argues that in order to promote justice, it may be more effective to encourage perspective taking and reasoning than emphasizing emotional sharing with the misfortune of others.

While empathy plays an important role in motivating caring for others and in guiding moral behavior, Decety's research demonstrates that this is far from being systematic or irrespective to the social identity of the targets, interpersonal relationships, and social context. He proposes that empathic concern (compassion) has evolved to favor kin and members of one own social group, can bias social decision-making by valuing one single individual over a group of others, and this can frontally conflict with principles of fairness and justice.

Recently, drawing on empirical research in evolutionary theory, developmental psychology, social neuroscience, and psychopathy, Jean Decety argued that empathy and morality are neither systematically opposed to one another, nor inevitably complementary.

Empathy and psychopathy
A lack of empathy is a hallmark characteristic of psychopathy. As a consequence, Decety investigates atypical socioemotional processing and moral judgment in forensic  psychopaths with a mobile MRI scanner, because they provide a natural model in which emotional and attentional processes are altered, enabling identification of downstream effects, including the extent to which empathy is a critical input for caring. His work shows that the higher the level of psychopathy, the less neural activity in ventromedial prefrontal cortex in response to perceiving interpersonal harm as well as expressions of physical and emotional pain. This region is attributed with various functions related to valuation, affect regulation and social cognition.

Moral conviction
Decety started a new line of inquiry into characterizing the neural mechanisms of what he calls "the dark side of morality," in particular, the role of moral conviction in justifying violence. While violence is often described as antithetical to sociality, it can be motivated by moral values with the ultimate goal of regulating social relationships, as shown by the work of Alan Fiske. In fact, most violence in the world appears to be rooted in conflict between moral values.

Moral development across cultures
To understand how morality emerges from the interaction between innate predispositions, shaped by evolution and input from local cultural environments, Decety conducts empirical research on the development of moral cognition and its relation to prosociality across different countries using behavioral economics games.

A first study combined measures of socioeconomic status (SES), executive functions, affective sharing, empathy, theory of mind, and moral judgment in predicting altruism in children from the age of 5 to 12 in five large‐scale societies: Canada, China, Turkey, South Africa, and the US. Results demonstrate that age, gender, SES, and cognitive processes (executive function and theory of mind), but not empathy, were the best predictor of children's generosity in a costly resource allocation game. Such results fit well with a growing literature suggesting that advanced theory of mind and executive functioning promote moral behavior.

A second study examined the extent to which social norms are integrated into fairness considerations and how they influence social preferences regarding equality and equity in a large sample of children in Argentina, Canada, Chile, China, Colombia, Cuba, Jordan, Mexico, Norway, South Africa, Taiwan, Turkey, and the US.  Social decision-making in distributive justice games revealed universal developmental shifts from equality-based to equity-based distribution decisions across cultures. However, differences in levels of individualism and collectivism between the countries, classified by the Hofstede scale, predicted the age and extent to which children favor equity for recipients differing in terms of wealth, merit, and physical suffering to elicit empathy. Children from the most individualistic cultures endorsed equitable distributions to a greater degree than children from more collectivist cultures when recipients differed in regards to wealth and merit. Children from the more individualistic cultures also favored equitable distribution at an earlier age than children from more collectivist cultures overall. These results provide insights into theories positing that fairness is a universal moral concern, and that humans naturally favor fair distributions, not equal ones. They suggest commonalities in children's development of fairness conceptualizations and preferences across diverse cultures. However, social learning within a culture does appear to affect some aspects of prosociality and concern for equity.

Controversies
In 2015 Decety published a study examining religion and morality in children that concluded "that children from households identifying as either of the two major world religions (Christianity and Islam) were less altruistic than children from non-religious households." The study utilized behavioral measures of punitive tendencies when evaluating interpersonal harm, moral judgment, empathy, and generosity (Dictator Game) in 1,151 children aged 5–12 years sampled from six countries (Canada, China, Jordan, South Africa, Turkey and USA). The authors found that children from religious households believe that interpersonal harm is more “mean” and deserving of harsher punishment than non-religious children. They also reported that religiousness was inversely predictive of children's altruism at least when generosity is spontaneously directed to an anonymous beneficiary. The study received widespread attention from news outlets and social media, with news outlets citing it as evidence that religious children are more selfish than their secular counterparts. Decety retracted the article.A tale of mistake and retraction shows that science works—eventually.

However, Decety has retracted the study, citing an analysis error which nullified the studies conclusion on religiousness and altruism. This came about after Azim F. Shariff reanalyzed the Decety's original data and observed that there was a mistake in the original study, coding country as a continuous rather than categorical variable. Once this error was corrected, as Shariff wrote, "most of the associations they observed with religious affiliation appear to be artifacts of between-country differences, driven primarily by low levels of generosity in Turkey and South Africa. However, children from highly religious households do appear slightly less generous than those from moderately religious ones." Decety has stated "When we reanalyzed these data to correct this error, we found that country of origin, rather than religious affiliation, is the primary predictor of several of the outcomes."

Edited books
 Social Cognition: Development Across the Life Span (2017). Jessica A. Sommerville and Jean Decety (Eds). New York: Routledge.
 The Moral Brain: A Multidisciplinary Perspective (2015). Jean Decety and Thalia Wheatley (Eds). Cambridge: MIT Press.
 New Frontiers in Social Neuroscience (2014). Jean Decety and Yves Christen (Eds). Berlin: Springer.
 Empathy - from Bench to Bedside (2012). Jean Decety (Ed). Cambridge: MIT Press, Cambridge.
 The Oxford Handbook of Social Neuroscience (2011). Jean Decety and John T. Cacioppo (Eds). New York: Oxford University Press.
 The Social Neuroscience of Empathy (2009). Jean Decety and William Ickes (Eds). Cambridge: MIT Press, Cambridge.
 Interpersonal Sensitivity: Entering Others' Worlds (2007). Jean Decety and C. Daniel Batson (Eds). Hove: Psychology Press.

References

External links

 Society for Social Neuroscience home page
 University of Chicago News
 University of Chicago Child Neurosuite
 Establishing a Society for Social Neuroscience
 A New Society for Social Neuroscience

1960 births
University of Chicago faculty
American neuroscientists
Fellows of the American Association for the Advancement of Science
French people of Jewish descent
French academics
French neuroscientists
French psychologists
Cognitive neuroscientists
American moral psychologists
Living people
University of Lyon alumni